Chang Zhang-xing (born 5 March 1986) is best known for his roles as gangster in various Taiwanese films and television series. He began his acting career in 2007, and is best known for his performance in The Pace of Consciousness, an autobiographical film that he wrote, directed, and starred in. For this film, he also received the 33rd Golden Harvest Award for Best Actor. He is currently studying in the College of Creative Media in Kun Shan University.

In August 2014, Chang joined the agency, Lan Se Production.

Filmography

Directed works 
 2011 【 The Pace of Consciousness 】 Writer, director, actor
 2012 【  If the Blossoms Fall 】 Writer, director
 2014 【 When It Begins to Blossom 】 Writer, director

As actor

Feature films
Passed By as Gangster boss
Sweet Alibis as Ah Xing
Mole of Lifeas  Ah Xing
Apolitical Romance as Ah De
Legend of the T-Dog as Ah Xing
Juliets
When Love Comes as Ah Xing
Monga as Ah Xing

Short films
 Find the Money Dog as Gangster boss
 布袋甩尾 as Ah Yong
 Miss Olivia as Wang Dong
 The Pace of Consciousness as Ah Xing
 If as Ah Xing

Television
Baby Daddy as Ah Gou (Episodes 14, 15)
Haru as Onitsuka
事事達人 as Right-hand man
Sunset as Xiao Luo Sha
Love You So as Brothel customer
阿爸的靈魂之旅 as Guang Hui
Just Want to Live a Day Longer as Ah Gou
Little Miss as Ah Yong
Boys Can Fly as Ah Jin
A Midsummer's Night in Tainan as Tattooed Man
Feng Shui Family as Ah Xing (Episodes 1-5)
交錯 as Ah Xiong
第十二張生肖卡
New Gun Story as Gangster
Innocence as Ah Xing
Ni Yada as Tiger
Moonlight Friendship as Li Junan
Fingerprint as Debt Collector
Triad Princess as Lin Gui
The Victims' Game as Liao

References

External links 

 Facebook

1986 births
21st-century Taiwanese male actors
Taiwanese directors
Living people
Taiwanese male film actors
Taiwanese male television actors
People from Changhua County